Herbert Frederick Bremer (October 25, 1913 – November 28, 1979) was a catcher in Major League Baseball. He played for the St. Louis Cardinals.

References

External links

1913 births
1979 deaths
Major League Baseball catchers
St. Louis Cardinals players
Baseball players from Chicago